Payola is the second studio album by the American rock band Desaparecidos, released on June 23, 2015, through Epitaph Records.

Background and recording 

While Read Music/Speak Spanish, the band's first album, focused on themes relating to socioeconomics, marriage, and the American workforce, Payola consciously tackles a wider range of political issues. Payola is a cohesive body of raw, loud, and angry songs about endemic injustice, racial profiling, the mistreatment of immigrants, corporate greed, and domestic spying.

The band reunited in 2010 to play a Concert For Equality in its hometown of Omaha—an event organized by lead singer Conor Oberst to promote the repeal of then-recently enacted measures to prohibit businesses and landlords from hiring or renting to undocumented immigrants in Fremont, Nebraska. In 2012, the band worked with Mike Mogis to record some singles, and in the subsequent years recorded all the material for Payola.

Reception
Payola reached the number 160 position of the Billboard 200 on July 11 of 2015.

Track listing

Personnel

Conor Oberst: vocals, guitar
Denver Dalley: guitar
Ian McElroy: keyboards
Landon Hedges: bass, vocals
Matt Baum: drums

Cameos on the album include Tim Kasher of Cursive (on "City on the Hill"), Laura Jane Grace of Against Me! (on "Golden Parachutes"), and the So So Glos (on "Slacktivist"). Tracks including "MariKKKopa", "Backsell", "Anonymous", "The Left Is Right", "Te Amo Camila Vallejo", and "The Underground Man" were previously released as singles.

References 

2015 albums
Desaparecidos (band) albums
Epitaph Records albums